Viyarppinte Vila is a 1962 Indian Malayalam-language film, directed by M. Krishnan Nair and produced by T. E. Vasudevan. The film stars Sathyan, Adoor Bhasi, Thikkurissy Sukumaran Nair and Kedamangalam Sadanandan in lead roles. The film had musical score by V. Dakshinamoorthy.

Cast
Sathyan as Gopi 
Kalaikkal Kumaran 
Adoor Bhasi  as Anthony
Thikkurissy Sukumaran Nair as Krishana Kuruppu
Kedamangalam Sadanandan 
Muthukulam Raghavan Pillai as Pappu Pilla
Prathapachandran 
Aranmula Ponnamma as Sarasu
Bahadoor as Pupshangathan
O. Madhavan
Ragini as Omana

Soundtrack
The music was composed by V. Dakshinamoorthy and the lyrics were written by Abhayadev.

References

External links
 

1962 films
1960s Malayalam-language films
Films directed by M. Krishnan Nair